Nigeria's Top Model was a television event in Nigeria. Originally the show was planned to be a multi-episode reality competition such as the original format of America's Next Top Model. However, after an unsuccessful attempt to gain the rights for the 
franchise it was modeled as a competition that only lasted one evening. It took place on April 27, 2007. The event was held in London with prizes such as a contract with acclaimed agency Select Models and immediate booking for shows in Johannesburg, Cape Town, Durban and others. Girls between 18 and 28 and who were at least 5'8 were allowed to compete.
In a pageant-style contest with fourteen chosen girls competing in order to win the title of Nigeria's Top Model. In the first round the girls were narrowed down to six and with a second round resulting in the top 3 placements where Olabimitan Adeyinka took home victory. Given the big success the show enjoyed a second "Cycle" was planned but further plans did not surpass that stage.

Judges

Two Top Models presented the show, they were:
Adora Oleh
Oreke

The judges were
Jan Malan (Chief Judge - director of Umzingeli Productions)
Adebayo Jones (Haute Couture Fashion Designer)
Shevelle Rhule (Pride Magazine)
Sarah Leon (Select Models)
Charles Thomson
Matthew Mensah
Sesan Awonoiki
Stefan Lindemann (editor Grazia Magazine)
Aneka Johnson (Founder Miss Black Britain).

Cycle Summary

Contestants
(ages stated at time of contest)

References

Featured Trend: Nigeria’s Next Top Model

Nigerian reality television series
2007 Nigerian television series debuts
2007 Nigerian television series endings
2000s Nigerian television series
HiTV original programming